Veneer is a four-track extended play by Irish noise pop band September Girls. The E.P. was recorded at Guerilla Studios in Dublin and released on November 24, 2014 via Fortuna Pop! (EU) and Kanine Records (US), 11 months after the release of their debut album Cursing the Sea.

Track list

Recording and Release
September Girls recorded Veneer following the release of September Girls first album Cursing the Sea at Guerilla Studios in Dublin. The first single to be taken from the record was the title-track which came out on October 13, accompanied by a music video directed by band member Jessie Ward. This was quickly followed by the second single 'Black Oil'. Veneer was eventually released on November 24, 2015 on record labels Fortuna Pop! and Kanine Records.

Critical reception
Veneer was well received by critics upon it release, with many reviewers comparing it favorably to the band's debut album Cursing the Sea. Lisa Wright of NME stated "Where September Girls' debut earmarked them as the latest addition to the Dum Dum Girls/Vivian Girls school of Phil Spector worship, 'Veneer' finds the Irish quintet throwing off the '60s girl-group coyness in favour of something fiercer." While Chris Buckle of The Skinny (magazine) said "Eleven months after debut album Cursing the Sea established a September Girls-sound hewn from heavy reverb, fuzzy melodies and a moody noir complexion, Veneer steers the Dublin quintet into marginally darker and more turbulent waters."

The E.P also received positive reviews from the group's native city with Irish music critic Stephen White of The Last Mixed Tape stating that "September Girls are a band defined by their individuality and commitment to never staying in the same spot sonically or stylistically. Veneer showcases this essential central characteristic." Local culture magazine In Dublin referred to the E.P. as "a sure sign of a promising future for the Dublin band".

Personnel

September Girls
 Paula Cullen - Vocals, Lead Bass
 Caoimhe Derwin - Vocals, Rhythm Guitar
 Lauren Kerchner - Vocals, Keys
 Jessie Ward - Vocals, Lead Guitar
 Sarah Grimes - Drums

Technical personnel
 Recorded and Mixed by John Murphy 
 Mastered by Harvey Birrell

References

2014 EPs
Kanine Records EPs
September Girls albums